In computer science, Performance Application Programming Interface (PAPI) is a portable interface (in the form of a library) to  hardware performance counters on modern microprocessors. It is being widely used to collect low level performance metrics (e.g. instruction counts, clock cycles, cache misses) of computer systems running UNIX/Linux operating systems.

PAPI provides predefined high level hardware events summarized from popular processors and direct access to low level native events of one particular processor. Counter multiplexing and overflow handling are also supported.

Operating system support for accessing hardware counters is needed to use PAPI.

For example, prior to 2010, a Linux/x86 kernel had to be patched with a performance monitoring counters driver (perfctr link) to support PAPI.
Since Linux version 2.6.32, and PAPI 2010 releases, PAPI can leverage the existing perf subsystem in Linux, and thus does not need any out of tree driver to be functional anymore.

Supported Operating Systems and requirements are listed in the official repository's documentation INSTALL.txt.

See also 
 Performance analysis

Further reading 
 A Portable Programming Interface for Performance Evaluation on Modern Processors / International Journal of High Performance Computing Applications archive Volume 14 Issue 3, August 2000, Pages 189-204 doi:10.1177/109434200001400303 
 Dongarra, Jack, et al. "Using PAPI for hardware performance monitoring on Linux systems" // Conference on Linux Clusters: The HPC Revolution. Vol. 5. Linux Clusters Institute, 2001.

External links 
 Official site
 Philip Mucci, Performance Monitoring with PAPI / Dr.Dobbs, June 01, 2005
 Development of a PAPI Backend for the Sun Niagara 2 Processor, 2009

Profilers
Software optimization